"Walking in Memphis" is a song written and originally recorded by American singer-songwriter Marc Cohn, for whom it remains his signature song. It received a Song of the Year nomination at the 34th Grammy Awards in 1992, the same year that the 32-year-old Cohn won the Grammy for Best New Artist.

The song's lyrics are autobiographical, chronicling a 1985 trip that Cohn, then a struggling songwriter and singer, took to Memphis to overcome a bout of writer's block. After visiting the church where former soul singer Al Green was preaching, Elvis Presley's former home of Graceland, and a small nightclub in nearby Mississippi, as well as wandering various streets of downtown Memphis, he returned to New York and began composing the song.  While writing and recording sessions continued through the late 1980s, his debut album, on which the song was the lead single, was not released until 1991.

"Walking in Memphis" reached number 13 on the US Billboard Hot 100 chart in 1991, becoming Cohn's only top-forty hit on the chart. The song reached number three in Canada, number seven in Ireland, and number 11 in Australia. "Walking in Memphis" has since been covered several times, notably in 1995 by Cher and in 2003 by Lonestar.

Inspiration
Cohn has said that "Walking in Memphis" is "100 percent autobiographical". He has described it as a song about "a Jewish gospel-music-lover", and added that "the song is about more than just a place; it's about a kind of spiritual awakening, one of those trips where you're different when you leave. He was inspired to write "Walking in Memphis" by a 1985 visit to the Memphis, Tennessee, area. At the time, he was working as a session singer in New York City while pursuing a recording contract. In 2014, he recalled:One night while listening to all of my demos, I came to the realization that I shouldn't be signed, because I didn't have any great songs yet... I was 28 years old and not in love with my songs. James Taylor had written 'Fire and Rain' when he was 18, and Jackson Browne wrote 'These Days' when he was only 17. I thought: 'I'm already ten years older than these geniuses. It's never going to happen for me.' So it was a pretty desperate time, and I went to Memphis with that struggle at the forefront of my mind. After reading that James Taylor overcame writer's block by going to a place he had never been, Cohn visited Memphis.

A friend had told him "there were two things in particular that I had to do [in Memphis], things that would forever change me. They later became the centerpieces of 'Walking in Memphis'." Cohn added:The first thing was go to the Full Gospel Tabernacle Church on a Sunday morning to hear the Reverend Al Green preach. ... I [soon] had chills running up and down my spine. The service was so deeply moving that I found myself with sweat running down my face and tears in my eyes, totally enveloped by everything I was seeing and hearing. There was something incredibly powerful about Al Green's voice in that context. Even after three hours of continuous singing, his voice only got stronger and his band only got better. I sat there crying in the church, aware of the irony of how I used to cry in synagogue in Cleveland as a kid — but because I wanted to get the heck out of there! Al Green's service was one of the great experiences of my life."

The second piece of advice was that Cohn visit the Hollywood Café in Robinsonville, Mississippi (present-day Tunica Resorts, 35 miles south of Memphis), to see Muriel Davis Wilkins, a retired schoolteacher who performed at the cafe on Friday nights. Cohn remembered: When I arrived, Muriel, who ... was in her 60s, was onstage playing a beat-up old upright piano and singing gospel standards ... I felt an immediate connection to her voice, her spirit, her face, and her smile. I was totally transfixed by her music. While many of the patrons were busy eating and not paying close attention to Muriel, I couldn't take my eyes off her. During her breaks, the two of us would talk. Muriel asked me why I was there, and I told her I was a songwriter trying to find inspiration. I also told her a little bit about my childhood — how when I was two and a half years old, my mom had passed away very unexpectedly, and about ten years later, my dad had passed away and I'd been raised by a stepmother. My mother's death was a central event in my life, and I'd been writing a lot about it over the years, both in songs and in journals. I think a part of me felt stuck in time, like I'd never quite been able to work through that loss... By midnight, the Hollywood was still packed, and Muriel asked me to join her onstage. We soon realized that there wasn't a song in the universe that both of us knew in common. A quick thinker, Muriel started feeding me lyrics to gospel songs so that I could catch up in time to sing somewhat in rhythm with her and make up my own version of the melody. Some songs I was vaguely familiar with, and some I didn't know at all. The very last song we sang together that night was 'Amazing Grace'. After we finished and people were applauding, Muriel leaned over and whispered in my ear: 'Child, you can let go now.' It was an incredibly maternal thing for her to say to me. Just like sitting in Reverend Al Green's church, I was again transformed. It was almost as if my mother was whispering in my ear. From the time I left Memphis and went back home to New York City, I knew I had a song in me about my experience there.

Composition
Soon after returning to New York City, Cohn began constructing the melody for "Walking in Memphis" on his guitar:The music for 'Walking in Memphis', except for the bridge, is really just the same thing over and over again. It's an attempt to keep things simple so that the narrative is what the listener focuses on. The story keeps changing; it goes from one scenario to another, all following the thread of my elation, described in the lyric 'Walking with my feet ten feet off of Beale'. What's being expressed is my love of music and the spiritual transformation I've always felt through it. Cohn mentions Muriel Wilkins: Now Muriel plays piano every Friday at the Hollywood
And they brought me down to see her and they asked me if I would
Do a little number, and I sang with all my might
She said "Tell me are you a Christian child?" I said "Ma’am I am tonight." In 2014, Cohn noted: The line: 'Tell me are you a Christian child, and I said 'Ma'am I am tonight' – even in the moment I wrote it down, I knew I was getting closer to finding my songwriting voice. To this day, people still ask me if I am a Christian. While I have to admit that I enjoy the confusion the lyric brings, the thing that makes that line work is the fact that I'm a Jew. So many great artists over the years needed to hide the fact that they were Jewish to protect themselves and their families from anti-Semitism, so I'm proud of the fact that I could come right out and practically announce my religion on the first song I ever released.

In 1986, Cohn returned to the Hollywood Café to play "Walking in Memphis" and the other songs from his new album for Wilkins. After he finished, Wilkins said, "'You know the one where you mention me at the end? That's the best one you got!'" She died in October 1990, just before Cohn released "Walking in Memphis".

Critical reception
Pan-European magazine Music & Media described "Walking in Memphis" as "an inspiring song about the capitol of rock & roll, by this promising American singer/songwriter who is backed by an impressive gospel choir."

Commercial performance
Released as the first single from Cohn's self-titled debut album in March 1991, "Walking in Memphis" debuted at number 87 on the US Hot 100 in Billboard magazine dated March 30, 1991, with a subsequent two-month gradual chart ascent to the top 40. The single's number 38 ranking on the Hot 100 dated May 25, 1991, inaugurated a ten-week top 40 tenure with a peak of number 13 for two weeks, the first week of which was dated July 6, 1991—one day after Cohn's birthday. Overall "Walking in Memphis" spent 23 weeks on the Hot 100. "Walking in Memphis" was also a hit on Billboards Adult Contemporary chart (number 12) and crossed-over to the magazine's C&W chart (number 74). In Canada the song peaked at number three on the week dated July 13, 1991.

During its original release, "Walking in Memphis" reached number seven in Ireland but stalled at number 66 in the United Kingdom; its September 1991 re-release returned "Walking in Memphis" to the Irish top 20 at number 16 and introduced the single to the UK top 30 with a peak of number 22. (The re-release of "Walking in Memphis" replaced the original B-side, "Dig Down Deep", with a live version of "Silver Thunderbird" recorded July 17, 1991.) "Walking in Memphis" was also a top-twenty hit in both Australia and New Zealand, with chart peaks of number 11 and 18. In Europe, the single charted in France (number 45), Germany (number 25), the Netherlands (number 54), and Sweden (number 36).

At the 34th Grammy Awards in February 1992, "Walking in Memphis" was nominated for Song of the Year. Also, Cohn was nominated for the Best Pop Male Vocalist award for his vocals in "Walking in Memphis". Cohn did not win either award, although he did win the Grammy for Best New Artist.

Track listings and formats
 7" single "Walking in Memphis" – 4:18
 "Dig Down Deep" – 5:08

 7" single "Walking in Memphis" – 4:18
 "Silver Thunderbird" (live) – 5:26

 CD maxi "Walking in Memphis" – 4:18
 "Dig Down Deep" – 5:08
 "Saving the Best for Last" – 5:31

Charts

Weekly charts

Year-end charts

Certifications

Cher version

Background
"Walking in Memphis" was remade by American singer and actress Cher for her 21st studio album, It's a Man's World (1995). It was released as the album's lead single in the United Kingdom on October 16, 1995. Her version debuted at number 11 on the UK Singles chart for the week ending October 28, 1995. Despite being a comparative failure for Cher, "Walking in Memphis" was included in the set list for the singer's 1999–2000 Do You Believe? Tour, the first Cher tour subsequent to her recording of the song. In introducing the number, Cher would overstate how low the impact of her take on "Walking in Memphis" was, first citing Marc Cohn's original as "a huge hit", then her own version as "a huge bomb". Her cover was used on The X-Files in the final scene of the fifth-season episode "The Post-Modern Prometheus".

Critical reception
AllMusic described Cher's cover version of "Walking in Memphis" as "rousing". Jim Farber from Entertainment Weekly stated that it "must be heard to be believed." Pan-European magazine Music & Media wrote, "The regular version of Marc Cohn's low key ballad doesn't do much justice to Cher's throaty voice, which needs more drama. But the special mixes by Shut Up & Dance, Rated PG and Baby Doc do exactly that, with a lot of fast beats, echoes and ambient loops."

Live performances
 Do You Believe? Tour
 The Farewell Tour (sung on the fifth, sixth, seventh, eighth and the ninth leg of the tour)
 Cher at the Colosseum
 Dressed to Kill Tour
 Classic Cher
 Here We Go Again Tour

Track listings
 European cassette and 7-inch single "Walking in Memphis" – 3:55
 "Angels Running" – 4:35

 European CD single "Walking in Memphis" – 3:55
 "Angels Running" – 4:35
 "Walking in Memphis" (Shut Up & Dance Instrumental) – 5:16

 European remix CD and 12-inch single "Walking in Memphis" (Shut Up & Dance Vocal) – 5:04
 "Walking in Memphis" (Shut Up & Dance Instrumental) – 5:10
 "Walking in Memphis" (Rated P.G. Mix) – 7:25
 "Walking in Memphis" (Baby Doc Mix) – 7:11

Charts and certifications

Weekly charts

Year-end charts

Certifications

Lonestar version

Background
American country music band Lonestar reached number eight on the Hot Country Songs chart and number 61 on the Billboard Hot 100 in 2003 with a remake of "Walking in Memphis'''" released as a single off the album From There to Here: Greatest Hits. This version was featured on Smallville Season 3, Episode 5 "Perry" when Perry White returns to Metropolis.

Lonestar's lead vocalist Richie McDonald recalled that, during the two years of the band's inaugural phase as a bar band, "Walking in Memphis" was a staple of their set list from the beginning: "After we got our record deal, we stopped doing [any] cover songs but ... a few years later, [we were] in Memphis, Tennessee getting ready to do a benefit for St. Jude's down on Beale Street" – i.e. St. Jude Children's Research Hospital – "[and] we thought this would be a good time to do 'Walking in Memphis,' because we were right there on Beale ... One of the label guys was there [and] said, "Y'all should record that." We started doing it in our live shows and it just became something we wanted to put out."

Charts

Other versions
In the summer of 2005, Wouter (nl), the runner-up in Idool 2004, spent eleven weeks in the top 20 of the Flemish chart with his version of "Walking in Memphis", the track spending three weeks at #3: the track was included on Rock On, Wouter's only album release to-date. "Walking in Memphis" became a #5 hit in Sweden in December 2009 via a remake by Calle Kristiansson, the runner-up finalist in Idol 2009. Kristiansson's version of "Walking in Memphis" was included on his self-titled album issued in January 2010. A concert performance of "Walking in Memphis" by Eric Church was featured in the first installment of the 15-LP (vinyl) box set of Church recordings titled 61 Days in Church.
English heavyweight boxer Tyson Fury covered the song a capella and adopted into "Walking in Las Vegas," during the post-fight interview to celebrate the victory against Deontay Wilder in their third fight, which ended in 11th–round knockout.

On November 20, 2021, the song and music video were parodied on Saturday Night Live. The sketch ("Walking in Staten") featured Cohn along with Pete Davidson, Big Wet, and Method Man.

Songs based on "Walking in Memphis"

 Shut Up and Dance version ("Raving I'm Raving")
English electronic duo Shut Up and Dance released "Raving I'm Raving" on May 18, 1992, based significantly on "Walking in Memphis". Several lyrics were altered including the line "I'm walking in Memphis" becoming "I'm raving I'm raving".

The single reached number 2 on the UK Singles Chart in May 1992, but ran into difficulties as they had not obtained clearance. As a result, the track was banned, causing it to fall to number 15 the following week then leave the charts completely. Proceeds were ordered to be given to charity. Nonetheless, near the end of 1992, the song did make another appearance on the influential compilation Rave 92, with the sample removed and the lyrics and tune re-written. It also peaked at number 18 on the European Dance Radio Chart.

Scooter version ("I'm Raving")
In 1996, German hard dance band Scooter released a similar cover entitled "I'm Raving" as a single from their album Wicked!. The single was certified gold in Germany and peaked at number 4 on the German charts.

Pan-European magazine Music & Media wrote about the song, "Remember Marc Cohn's beautiful piano ballad Walking In Memphis? Change the lyrics in I'm Raving, I'm Raving, add some bagpipe-synths and the semi-live-gimmick patented by Scooter. This makes chart-storming seem effortless."

Saturday Night Live version ("Walking In Staten")
On the November 20, 2021 episode of Saturday Night Live'' hosted by Simu Liu, cast member Pete Davidson performed "Walking In Staten" along with Cohn, country pop artist Big Wet, and Method Man. The parody's lyrics and visuals are a playful tribute to Davidson's native Staten Island.

See also

 1991 in music

References

1991 singles
1995 singles
2003 singles
Black-and-white music videos
Marc Cohn songs
Cher songs
Lonestar songs
Songs about Memphis, Tennessee
Songs about Elvis Presley
Song recordings produced by Dann Huff
Song recordings produced by Christopher Neil
Pop ballads
1990s ballads
Atlantic Records singles
Warner Music Group singles
BNA Records singles
1991 songs
Articles containing video clips
Songs written by Marc Cohn

hu:I'm Raving